Zygoballus concolor is a species of jumping spider which occurs in Cuba. It was first described by the arachnologist Elizabeth B. Bryant in 1940.

The male holotype was collected from Soledad, Consolación del Sur and the female allotype was collected from Havana. The type specimens are housed at the Museum of Comparative Zoology in the United States.

References

External links

Zygoballus concolor at Worldwide database of jumping spiders
Zygoballus concolor at Salticidae: Diagnostic Drawings Library

Salticidae
Spiders of the Caribbean
Spiders described in 1940